The 2005–06 Alabama Crimson Tide men's basketball team (variously "Alabama", "UA", "Bama" or "The Tide") represented the University of Alabama in the 2005–06 college basketball season. The head coach was Mark Gottfried, who was in his eight season at Alabama. The team played its home games at Coleman Coliseum in Tuscaloosa, Alabama and was a member of the Southeastern Conference. This was the 93rd season of basketball in the school's history. The Crimson Tide finished the season 18–13, 10–6 in SEC play, lost in the second round of the 2006 SEC men's basketball tournament. They were invited to the NCAA tournament and lost in the round of 32.

Schedule and results

|-
!colspan=12 style=|Exhibition

|-
!colspan=12 style=|Non-conference regular season

|-
!colspan=12 style=|SEC regular season

|-
!colspan=12 style=| SEC tournament

|-
!colspan=12 style="background:#990000; color:#FFFFFF;"|  NCAA tournament

See also
2006 NCAA Division I men's basketball tournament
2005–06 NCAA Division I men's basketball season
2005–06 NCAA Division I men's basketball rankings

References

Alabama
Alabama Crimson Tide men's basketball seasons
2005 in sports in Alabama
Alabama Crimson Tide
Alabama